Mortimer is a masculine given name which may refer to:

 Mortimer J. Adler (1902–2001), American philosopher, educator and author
 Mortimer Caplin (1916–2019), American lawyer and educator
 Mortimer Cleveland (1883–?), American architect
 Mortimer Collins (1827–1876), English poet and novelist
 Mortimer Davis (1866–1928), Canadian businessman and philanthropist
 Mortimer Durand (1850–1924), British diplomat and civil servant in British India
 Mortimer Fitzland Elliott (1839–1920), American politician
 Mortimer Hogan (1862–1923), American Major League Baseball outfielder
 Mortimer von Kessel (1893–1981), German World War II general
 Mort Leav (1916–2005), American comic book and advertising artist
 Mortimer Dormer Leggett (1821–1896), American lawyer, school administrator, professor and Union Army major general during the American Civil War
 Mortimer Lewis (1796–1879), English architect and surveyor; Colonial Architect in New South Wales
 Mortimer von Maltzan (1793–1843), Prussian diplomat and Foreign Minister
 Mortimer Menpes (1855–1938), Australian-born artist, author, printmaker and illustrator
 Mortimer M. Miller (1929–2017), American politician and writer
 Mortimer Mishkin (1926–2021), American neuropsychologist
 Mortimer L. Neinken (1896–1984), American stamp collector
 Mortimer Planno (1929–2006), drummer and Rastafari elder best known as the Rasta teacher of Bob Marley
 Mortimer R. Proctor (1889-1968), American politician, 66th governor of Vermont
 Mortimer Sackler (1916–2010), American physician, entrepreneur and philanthropist
 Mortimer L. Schiff (1877–1931), American banker and Boy Scouts of America leader
 Mortimer Singer (1863–1929), Anglo-American landowner, philanthropist, sportsman and early pilot
 Mortimer Thomson (1832–1875), American journalist and humorist
 Mortimer Tollemache (1872–1950), English cricketer
 Mort Weisinger (1915–1978), American magazine and comic book editor
 Mortimer Wheeler (1890–1976), British archaeologist
 Mortimer Wilson (1876–1932), American composer of classical music
 Mortimer Zuckerman (born 1937), Canadian-born American businessman

See also
 Mort (name)

Masculine given names
English masculine given names